This is a list of properties and districts in Bleckley County, Georgia that are listed on the National Register of Historic Places (NRHP).

Current listings

|}

References

Bleckley
Bleckley County, Georgia
National Register of Historic Places in Bleckley County, Georgia